Property maintenance relates to the upkeep of a home, apartment, rental property or building and may be a commercial venture through a property maintenance company, an employee of the company which owns a home, apartment or a self-storage pastime for example day-to-day housekeeping or cleaning.

See also
Facility management
Activity relationship chart
Building information modeling
Computerized maintenance management system
Physical plant
1:5:200
Home repair

References

Building engineering
Maintenance